Roller sports (as Extreme sports) at the 2007 Asian Indoor Games was held in MUST Pavilion, Macau, China from 26 October to 2 November 2007.

Medalists

Roller freestyle

Skateboarding

Medal table

Results

Roller freestyle

Big air
28 October

Park
26–28 October

Park best trick
27 October

Vert
31 October – 2 November

Skateboarding

Park
27–28 October

Park best trick
27 October

References
 Official Website - Skateboard
 Official Website - Inline Stunt
 Official Website - BMX Freestyle

2007 Asian Indoor Games events
Asian Indoor Games